LA-45 is a constituency of Azad Kashmir Legislative Assembly which is currently represented by Abdul Majid Khan of Pakistan Tehreek-e-Insaf. It covers the area of Khyber Pakhtunkhwa in Pakistan. Only refugees from Kashmir Valley settled in Pakistan are eligible to vote.

Election 2016 

elections were held in this constituency on 21 July 2016.

Election 2021 
Further Information: Azad Kashmir Election 2021

Abdul Majid Khan of Pakistan Tehreek-e-Insaf won the seat by obtaining 3138 votes.''

References 

Azad Kashmir Legislative Assembly constituencies